The Stratford Kroehlers were a junior ice hockey team that played in the Ontario Hockey Association.  The Kroehlers were named for the Kroehler Furniture Company, a furniture manufacturer and team sponsor. The team played at the Stratford Arena, now known as the William Allman Memorial Arena, in Stratford, Ontario.

Before 1942, the team was known as the Stratford Midgets, and briefly as the Stratford Kist. The Kroehlers entered the OHA in 1942 and played until the team folded in 1951. There was a brief hiatus for two seasons near the end of World War II. In the 1947–48 season, George Armstrong won the Red Tilson Trophy as the OHA's most outstanding player, and the Eddie Powers Memorial Trophy as the league's top scorer.

NHL alumni
Two former Kroehlers have been inducted into the Hockey Hall of Fame: George Armstrong as a player and Howie Meeker as a broadcaster.

1942-1944

1946-1951

Yearly Results

External links
William Allman Memorial Arena - The OHL Arena & Travel Guide
Photo Album - William Allman Memorial Arena

Defunct Ontario Hockey League teams
Sport in Stratford, Ontario